1-Hydroxyphenanthrene is a phenanthrol and a human metabolite of phenanthrene that can be detected in urine of persons exposed to PAHs.

It can also be used as a marker for PAH pollution measured in marine fish bile.

The model fungus Cunninghamella elegans produces, in the case of the biodegradation of phenanthrene, a glucoside conjugate of 1-hydroxyphenanthrene (phenanthrene 1-O-beta-glucose).

Relationship with smoking 
Highly significant differences and dose-response relationships with regard to cigarettes smoked per day were found for 2-, 3- and 4-hydroxyphenanthrene and 1-hydroxypyrene, but not for 1-hydroxyphenanthrene.

References

External links 
 

Phenanthrenoids
Phenolic human metabolites